Janne Leskinen (born 24 July 1971 in Kuopio) is a retired Finnish alpine skier who competed in the 1994 Winter Olympics.

External links
 sports-reference.com
 

1971 births
Living people
Finnish male alpine skiers
Olympic alpine skiers of Finland
Alpine skiers at the 1994 Winter Olympics
People from Kuopio
Sportspeople from North Savo
20th-century Finnish people